Otto Dessloch (11 June 1889 – 13 May 1977) was a German Luftwaffe general during World War II and recipient of the Knight's Cross of the Iron Cross with Oak Leaves of Nazi Germany.

Career
Dessloch was born in Bamberg, he joined the Bavarian Army in 1910 and served during World War I. After the German defeat, he joined the right-wing Freikorps forces of Franz von Epp, fighting against the Bavarian Soviet Republic. From 1921, he served as an intelligence officer in the German Reichswehr. In the course of German re-armament, he attended the secret Lipetsk fighter-pilot school in 1926–27. Dessloch took part in the fast build-up of the Luftwaffe after the Nazi seizure of power in 1933, from 1 December 1934 as commander of a Deutsche Verkehrsfliegerschule (flight training school). From 1935 he served as commander of two Luftwaffe wings.

During World War II he commanded a Luftflotte 2 corps from 3 October 1939 and was appointed Major general and commander of the 6th flight division on 1 January. He provided air support to the Wehrmacht Army Group B in the 1940 Battle of France and from 1941 commanded Luftwaffe units on the Eastern Front. Promoted to General der Flakartillerie on 1 January 1942, he served as a commander on the southern Eastern Front and in the Caucasus Mountains. On 11 June 1943 Dessloch succeeded Wolfram Freiherr von Richthofen as commander-in-chief of Luftflotte 4 in the rank of Colonel general.

When in the summer 1944 the Western Front collapsed, Dessloch was appointed commander of Luftflotte 3 by Hermann Göring to replace dismissed Hugo Sperrle. After Paris was liberated by the Allied forces, Dessloch commanded an air unit that, in retaliation, bombed the city destroying civilian targets and killing 200 French civilians in September 1944. The attack was carried out on Hitler's personal order. From September he again served as commander of Luftflotte 4 until he succeeded Robert Ritter von Greim as head of Luftflotte 6 during the last days of the war. Dessloch was interned by the Allies until 1948.

He died in Munich in 1977.

Awards

 Iron Cross (1914)  2nd Class (20 August 1914) & 1st Class (21 September 1915)
 Bavarian Military Merit Order 4th Class with Swords (19 April 1915) & 4th Class with Crown and Swords (9 November 1917)
 Honor Goblet of the Luftwaffe 
Wound Badge (1914) in Black (15 May 1918)
 Clasp to the Iron Cross (1939)  2nd Class (13 May 1940) & 1st Class (24 May 1940)

 Knight's Cross of the Iron Cross with Oak Leaves
 74th Knight's Cross on 24 June 1940 as Generalmajor and commanding general of the II. Flak-Korps
 470th Oak Leaves on 10 May 1944 as Generaloberst and commander in chief of Luftflotte 4

References

Citations

Bibliography

 
 
 
 

1889 births
1977 deaths
People from the Kingdom of Bavaria
People from Bamberg
Luftwaffe World War II generals
Recipients of the Knight's Cross of the Iron Cross with Oak Leaves
German Army personnel of World War I
Recipients of the clasp to the Iron Cross, 1st class
20th-century Freikorps personnel
Reichswehr personnel
German prisoners and detainees
Military personnel from Bavaria
Colonel generals of the Luftwaffe
Luftstreitkräfte personnel